San Venanzo is a comune (municipality) in the Province of Terni in the Italian region Umbria, located about  southwest of Perugia and about  northwest of Terni.  

San Venanzo borders the following municipalities: Ficulle, Fratta Todina, Marsciano, Monte Castello di Vibio, Montegabbione, Orvieto, Parrano, Piegaro, Todi.

References

Cities and towns in Umbria